Die Kreuzen is the eponymously titled debut album of Die Kreuzen, released in 1984 through Touch and Go Records. This is Die Kreuzen's last Hardcore Punk album before they moved on to other styles of music such as Alternative Rock.

Track listing

Personnel 
Die Kreuzen
Keith Brammer – bass guitar
Brian Egeness – guitar
Dan Kubinski – vocals
Erik Tunison – drums
Production and additional personnel
Rick Canzano – engineering
Richard Kohl – illustrations
Corey Rusk – production

References

External links 
 

1984 debut albums
Die Kreuzen albums
Touch and Go Records albums